Barry Kalms is an Australian Paralympic weightlifter and athlete. At the 1980 Summer Paralympics he won a bronze medal in the Men's Weightlifting Lightweight 65 kg amputee division and competed in various athletics events (specifically high jump, long jump and the 100 m).

References

Paralympic athletes of Australia
Paralympic weightlifters of Australia
Athletes (track and field) at the 1980 Summer Paralympics
Weightlifters at the 1980 Summer Paralympics
Medalists at the 1980 Summer Paralympics
Paralympic bronze medalists for Australia
Australian amputees
Australian male weightlifters
Year of birth missing (living people)
Living people
Paralympic medalists in weightlifting
Australian male sprinters
Australian male high jumpers
Australian male long jumpers
Sprinters with limb difference
Long jumpers with limb difference
High jumpers with limb difference
Paralympic sprinters
Paralympic long jumpers
Paralympic high jumpers
20th-century Australian people